In The Name Of Our Father is a 2018 novel written by Nigerian author Olukorede Yishau.

Plot
In The Name Of Our Father is set during the military regime of Sani Abacha, the then military head of state of Nigeria.

Awards and nominations
Prestigious Book of Year for Lagos Book and Art Festival (2019).
Nominee Nigeria Prize for Literature (2021).

References

2018 Nigerian novels